The 2014 South Australian National Football League season (officially the SANFL IGA League) was the 135th season of the South Australian National Football League (SANFL) Australian rules football competition. 

2014 introduced a number of changes to the league. The size of the league increased from 9 clubs to 10 clubs, after the South Australian Football Commission granted the Australian Football League's Adelaide Football Club a licence to field a reserves team in the competition. Adelaide Oval replaced Football Park as headquarters of the SANFL, resulting in the renovated venue hosting one SANFL minor round match (Anzac Day) and all six SANFL finals matches. The season was shortened to finish a week before the AFL Grand Final, instead of a week after, as had been the case for most years since 1980.

Norwood were the premiers for the 2014 season, after they defeated Port Adelaide by 4 points in the Grand Final in front of a crowd of 38,644, the largest such crowd since 1999. It was the third consecutive premiership for Norwood and their 30th overall.

Sturt, South Adelaide and Woodville-West Torrens also made the top (final) five teams and participated in the finals series.  North Adelaide, Central District, Adelaide, West Adelaide and Glenelg all missed the top five, with Glenelg finishing bottom to record its 17th wooden spoon.

Premiership season
Highlights of the season fixture include:
 A shortened 18-round home and away competition, in which each team plays each other twice
 A record 17 night matches, mostly staged in the early part of the season
 Two Showdown matches between Adelaide Football Club and Port Adelaide
 Two Anzac Day matches, including the Grand Final rematch between Norwood vs. North Adelaide at the Adelaide Oval 
 First SANFL Grand Final at Adelaide Oval since 1973, to be played at an earlier than usual date on Sunday September 21
 Seven Network replaces ABC as sole television broadcaster; televises one live “match of the round” every week as well as all finals
 The official season motto was announced by the SANFL as: This is Football.

Source: SANFL Season 2014 Results and Fixtures

Round 1

Round 2

Round 3

Round 4

Round 5

Round 6

Round 7

Round 8

State Game

 Report

Round 9

Round 10

Round 11

Round 12

Round 13

Round 14

Round 15

Round 16

Round 17

Round 18

Ladder

Finals series

Qualifying and Elimination Finals

Semi-finals

Preliminary final

Grand Final

Club performances

SANFL Premiership

† Adelaide had only one home game in 2014; at Clare Oval in the regional town of Clare. Also Norwood's "home" crowd in Round 4 was 10,014 (Rd 4) for the Anzac Day match at Adelaide Oval against North Adelaide.

SANFL Win/Loss Table

Bold – Home game
X – Did Not Play
Opponent for round listed above margin

Foxtel Cup

Awards and events

Awards
 The Magarey Medal (awarded to the best and fairest player in the home and away season) was won by Zane Kirkwood of Sturt, who polled 29 votes.
 The Ken Farmer Medal (awarded to the leading goalkicker in the home and away season) was won by Michael Wundke of Woodville-West Torrens. He kicked 60 goals in the 2014 home and away season.
 The Stanley H. Lewis Memorial Trophy (awarded to the best performing club in the League, Reserves and Under 18 competitions) was won by North Adelaide, with 2375 points, 25 points ahead of Woodville-West Torrens.
 The R.O Shearman Medal (awarded to the player adjudged best by the 10 SANFL club coaches each game) was won by Steven Summerton of Port Adelaide.
 Port Adelaide were the minor premiers, finishing top of the ladder at the end of the home and away season with 12 wins and 6 losses. It is the club's 44th minor premiership in the SANFL.

Events
 The annual City v. Country Cup Match was held in April 2014 at the Adelaide Oval. City won by 31 points, defeating Country 12.10 (82) to 7.9 (51). Dale Armstrong won the Bill Botten Medal as best afield for City whilst Jackson O'Brien won Peter Kitschke Medal as best afield for Country.
 The Under 18 State Game was contested by South Australia (SANFL) and Western Australia (WAFL). South Australia recorded a 31-point win; 14.8 (92) def. 8.13 (61).
 The Under 16 Talent Shield competition was won by Glenelg, who defeated Sturt in the Grand Final at AAMI Stadium by 25 points; 11.11 (77) def. 7.10 (52).
 Jake Parkinson, a regional director for Australasian food and beverage company Lion, replaced Leigh Wicker in the role of Chief Executive Officer (CEO) of the SANFL in October.

Premiers
 Norwood were the League premiers, defeating Port Adelaide by 4 points.
 Woodville-West Torrens were the Reserves premiers, defeating Sturt by 16 points.
 West Adelaide were the Under 18 premiers, defeating Woodville-West Torrens by 35 points.

Notes

References

South Australian National Football League seasons
SANFL